Silence is the second full-length album by Finnish power metal band Sonata Arctica, released in 2001 through Spinefarm Records. It is the only studio album to feature keyboardist Mikko Härkin, and the first album with original member Marko Paasikoski, who returned to the band the previous year. Stratovarius lead singer Timo Kotipelto sang guest vocals on the album.

Concept and themes 
The cover art, featuring a landscape divided into night, summer and winter, was meant to depict nature. However, Tony explained that the cover was not supposed to feature too much symbolism, except for the footprints leading away from the campfire. He explained:

The title of the album was at first supposed to be longer, but Kakko's then-girlfriend suggested "silence" and he reflected on how important silence was for him:

The second track "Weballergy" is considered by Kakko to be a sequel to Ecliptica's "Blank File", as both of them cover the theme of Internet privacy.

"The End of This Chapter" starts the so-called Caleb saga, a series of songs that is continued in Reckoning Night's "Don't Say a Word", Unia's "Caleb", The Days of Grays's "Juliet", The Ninth Hour's "Till Death's Done Us Apart", and Talviyö's "The Last of the Lambs".

"The Power of One" is the longest Sonata Arctica song to date, at a length of 10:43, not including an extra minute of silence followed by an outtake from the narrator.

Track listing

Personnel
Sonata Arctica
Tony Kakko – vocals, additional keyboards
Jani Liimatainen – guitars
Mikko Härkin – keyboards
Marko Paasikoski – bass
Tommy Portimo – drums

Guest vocalists
Timo Kotipelto – backing vocals and last line (on track 3)
Nik Van-Eckmann – male voices (on tracks: 1, 4, 7 and 13)
Renay Gonzalez – female voice (on track 4)

Technical staff

Produced by Ahti Kortelainen at Tico Tico Studios
Mixed by Mikko Karmila at Finnvox Studios in April 2001
Mastered by Mika Jussila at Finnvox Studios
Cover art and logo by Eric Philipp
Inlay drawings by Tero Junkkila
Original logo concept by Janne "ToxicAngel" Pitkänen
Art Direction and background photos by T. Kakko
Band photo by Toni Härkönen

Charts

Certifications

References

External links
 Album info
 Lyrics

Sonata Arctica albums
2001 albums
Spinefarm Records albums